Muttagi  is a village in the northern state of Karnataka, India. It is located in the Basavana Bagevadi taluk of Bijapur district in Karnataka.

Demographics
 India census, Muttagi had a population of 5043 with 2542 males and 2501 females.

See also
 Districts of Karnataka

References
muttagi kalaghatgi

External links
 http://Bijapur.nic.in/

Villages in Bijapur district, Karnataka